Liberty Township is the name of some places in the U.S. state of Michigan:

 Liberty Township, Jackson County, Michigan
 Liberty Township, Wexford County, Michigan

See also 
 Liberty Township (disambiguation)

Michigan township disambiguation pages